Puneet Beniwal (born 14 February 1989) is an Indian Actor and model. He was declared as 1st Runner-up at Mr India World 2014.

Early life
Beniwal was born in New Delhi. He did his schooling from S.G.N, New Delhi. He holds a degree in Bachelor of Commerce from Sri Guru Gobind Singh College of Commerce, Delhi University, and did MBA from Guru Gobind Singh Indraprastha University.

Career
He is an Indian Model and the 1st runner-up of Mister India World 2014. He has walked the runway for top designers like Kenneth Cole, Rohit Bal, Manish Malhotra, Rohit Gandhi + Rahul Khanna, Varun Bhal, Raghavendra Rathore, Sabyasachi and others.

Mr India World 2014
He participated in Mr India World 2014 and was declared 1st Runner Up. The contest was won by Prateik Jain.

References

See also
Prateik Jain
Mr India World
Sushant Divgikar
Mr India World 2014

Living people
Indian male models
1989 births